333 North Water is an under-construction high-rise apartment building in the Third Ward neighborhood of Milwaukee, Wisconsin. The 342-foot, 31-story high-rise will become the state of Wisconsin's sixth tallest residential building when it is completed, and will feature 295 high-end apartments, 10,000 square feet of restaurant and retail space, and an adjoining 7-story parking structure with hundreds of parking spaces.

History
On May 19, 2021, the developer, Hines Interests Limited Partnership, announced its intention to develop a residential apartment tower in the Historic Third Ward that would rise 32 stories (365 feet) and contain 295 units, becoming the tallest building in the neighborhood. On June 16, 2021, the project was approved by the Historic Third Ward Architectural Review Board. The developer spent 2021 and most of 2022 securing permits and finalizing design before completing the site purchase for $6 million in June 2022.

Construction
Construction on the tower began in September 2022 with expected completion in 2024. Chicago based Solomon Cordwell Buenz is serving as the lead architect for the project with Chicago-based W.E. O'Neil Construction serving as the General Contractor. As part of the project, the city of Milwaukee created a $903,000 in tax incremental finance assistance for a 210-linear foot connection to the Milwaukee Riverwalk system.

References

External links 

Proposed skyscrapers in the United States
Buildings and structures in Milwaukee